HMS Fly (1813) was a Royal Navy  built by Jabez Bailey at Ipswich.  She was ordered 23 April 1812, launched on 16 February 1813 and commissioned May 1813.

She served:
 on the Channel station under Sir William G. Parker from May 1813,
 on the Newfoundland Station from June 1814 until paid off in April 1815,
 on the Cork station, after recommissioning in 1818, until December 1821,
 on Cape of Good Hope Station from December 1821,
 in South America from 1823,
 in East Indies from 1825.

In December 1826 Fly, under Captain Frederick Augustus Wetherall, supported the short-lived settlement of Western Port, in southern Victoria, Australia.

She was sold in Bombay on 10 April 1828.

See also
 Sir William Martin, 4th Baronet, commander on South American station in 1823

Citations

References

 
 
 
 
 

 

Brig-sloops of the Royal Navy
1813 ships
Cruizer-class brig-sloops